I Am Persuaded is the debut studio album from gospel singer Fred Hammond. It is Hammond's first album as a solo artist, recorded while still a member of the popular Gospel group Commissioned. The album was released on May 28, 1991, through Verity Records and Benson Records. The album contains a distinct early 1990s sound, and combines uptempo R&B, soul and new jack swing musical elements with its core gospel sound.

Chart performance 

The album peaked at No. 11 on Billboards Top Gospel Albums chart on September 7, 1991. It remained on the chart for 29 weeks.

Track listing 

 "I Am Persuaded" (Eric Brice, Fred Hammond) – 5:40
 "Mender of Broken Hearts" (Fred Hammond, Eddie Howard Jr.) – 5:09
 "I Came to Jesus As I Was / Grace" (Fred Hammond, Bernard Wright) – 9:47
 "If It Had Not Been (For the Lord on Our Side)" (Anson Dawkins, Mitchell Jones) – 5:00
 "Go (A Young Minister's Affirmation)" (Maxx Frank, Fred Hammond) – 4:56
 "That's What I'll Do to Keep on Lovin' You" (Maxx Frank, Michael Winans, Regina Winans) – 4:49
 "Wake Up" (Percy Bady, Steve Huff) – 4:07
 "That Rugged Cross" (Maxx Frank, Fred Hammond) – 2:55
 "I'm Not Afraid" (Percy Bady) – 3:34

Personnel 
Adapted from AllMusic.com.

 Fred Hammond – producer, lead vocals, background vocals, vocal arrangements, bass, drum programming
 Eric Brice – producer
 Dan Clearly – executive producer
 Mitchell Jones – keyboards, vocal arrangements
 Vic Adams – background vocals
 Mike Allen – background vocals
 Lizz Lee – background vocals
 Andre Reamus – background vocals
 Rayse Biggs – horns
 Dana Davis – drums
 Maxx Frank – keyboards, organ
 Mike Williams – drums
 John Jaszcz – engineer
 Eric Morgeson – engineer
 Randy Poole – engineer
 Ben De Biase – assistant engineer
 Raymond Hammond – assistant engineer
 June Arnold – grooming
 Connie Harrington – art direction
 Russ Harrington – photography

Charts

References 

1991 debut albums
Fred Hammond albums